Phunk Shui (a.k.a. All Good People) is a 2002 rock album by John Oates who is best known as being part of the rock and soul duo Hall & Oates. The album was originally released on August 20, 2002.

The Phunk Shui CD was released four more times, with bonus tracks added each time. On October 29, 2002, a Japanese version added the bonus track "Mona Lisa's Eyes" (this version was released in the United States on May 20, 2003, as All Good People). Two more bonus tracks were added on November 18, 2003, (title changing back to Phunk Shui) for a new USA version ("Time Will Tell" and a live recording of "People Get Ready"). In 2006, a DualDisc version of Phunk Shui was released under the title John Oates Solo – The Album, The Concert. The CD side is the 14-track version of Phunk Shui and the DVD side is John Oates: Live At The Historic Wheeler Opera House; the bonus live CD that accompanied the live DVD is not included.

The album title is a play on the words "funk" and "feng shui".

Track listing
 "Color of Love" (Jed Leiber, Oates) – 3:58
 "It Girl" (Leiber, Oates) – 4:09
 "All Good People" (Oates, Steve Postell) – 3:22
 "Love in a Dangerous Time" (Oates, Arthur Baker, Tommy Faragher) – 4:06
 "Unspoken" (Keith Follese, Oates) – 3:30
 "Soul Slide" (Oates, Postell) – 3:34
 "Go Deep" (Oates, Leiber, T-Bone Wolk) – 5:33
 "Little Angel" (Oates) – 5:03
 "Beauty" (Oates, Jamie Rosenberg) – 3:14
 "Phunk Shui" (Oates, Leiber, J. Pullin) – 4:33
 "Electric Ladyland" (Jimi Hendrix) – 3:59
 "Mona Lisa's Eyes" (available on second and subsequent releases) (Oates, Leiber) – 3:52
 "Time Will Tell" (available on third release and all releases afterward) (Oates, Leiber) – 4:14
 "People Get Ready" (live) (available on third and subsequent releases) (Curtis Mayfield) – 3:47

Production 
 John Oates – producer, arrangements 
 Jed Leiber – producer, arrangements
 Peter Moshay – rhythm track recording, mixing
 Jamie Rosenberg – vocal, guitar and percussion recording 
 Todd Goldstein – recording (14)
 Tom Fritze – additional recording (1-11), recording (12, 13)
 Michael Olsen – additional recording (1-11), recording (12, 13)
 Tanner Oates – assistant engineer (1-11)
 Oren Hader – assistant engineer (13)
 Bob Ludwig – mastering at Gateway Mastering (Portland, Maine)
 Art Burrows – design, photography 
 Aimee Oates – titlest
 Doyle/Kos Entertainment – management

Personnel 
 John Oates – vocals, guitars
 Jed Leiber – keyboards 
 Tom "T-Bone" Wolk – bass, guitars (5, 8, 11, 12)
 Steve Holley – drums, percussion 
 The "Blo Notes" – backing vocals 

Additional musicians
 Steve Postell – backing vocals (1, 3, 6, 10, 14), guitars (3, 5)
 Jamie Rosenberg – guitars (9)
 Damian Smith – guitars (10)
 Kennard Ramsey – guitars (13)
 Kevin Hupp – drums (3, 9)
 Shawn Pelton – drums (13)
 Michael Olson – percussion (1, 2)
 John Michel – backing vocals (1, 3, 6, 10, 14), percussion (8, 9, 10)
 Mo Lipps – trumpet (2)
 Michael Jude – backing vocals (1, 3, 6, 10, 14)
 Leigh Jude – backing vocals (10)
 Claudia Potimkin – backing vocals (10)
 Claire Stasior – backing vocals (10)
 Paris Delane – vocals (14)

2002 debut albums
John Oates albums